The AFL Rising Star is an Australian rules football award presented annually to the player adjudged the best young player in the Australian Football League (AFL) for the year. An eligible player is nominated for the award each round during the AFL's regular season, and a panel of experts votes for the winner at the end of the season.

During the 2017 season, the award was sponsored by National Australia Bank, and the winner announced in a presentation held on 1 September 2017 and broadcast on subscription television by Fox Footy. The voting panel for this season consisted of eleven members, all of whom were AFL officials or former players: Kevin Bartlett, Luke Darcy, Andrew Dillon, Danny Frawley, Glen Jakovich, Chris Johnson, Cameron Ling, Gillon McLachlan, Matthew Richardson, Warren Tredrea and Kevin Sheehan. The winner was Essendon player Andrew McGrath, who polled 51 votes. McGrath became only the third number-one draft pick to win the award, and the second Essendon recipient.

The club that garnered the most individual nominations this season was Carlton with five players nominated for the award. This was a club record and the equal-second most nominations a club has garnered in an individual season, behind Greater Western Sydney's eight nominations in the 2012 season. Brisbane Lions player Alex Witherden, who received a nomination in round 17, was nominated for the award again in the 2018 season—becoming the eleventh player ever to be nominated twice for a Rising Star award.

Nominations

Final voting

See also 
 2017 AFL Women's Rising Star

References 

Afl Rising Star, 2017
Australian rules football-related lists